Dan Stone may refer to:
 Dan Stone (DJ)
Dan Stone (historian)

See also
Daniel Stone, one of the Rosemarkie sculpture fragments